is a Japanese apparel designer and former singer and actress. At age 6, she auditioned for Hello! Project Kids in 2002 and later became part of Cute, a Japanese idol girl group associated with Hello! Project.

Career

2002–2005: Hello! Project Kids, 4Kids

In 2002, Hagiwara auditioned for Hello! Project Kids with the song "Te wo Nigitte Arukitai" by Maki Goto. Her audition tape was aired on Morning Musume's variety show Hello! Morning. She was placed in the group with 14 other girls. She made her first appearance as an angel in the 2002 film Mini Moni ja Movie: Okashi na Daibōken!; she also was one of the featured artists in the movie's ending song as a member of 4Kids. Later, in 2004, she participated in singing "All for One & One for All!", a collaboration single released by all Hello! Project artists under the name "H.P. All Stars."

2005–2015: Cute, Kira Pika, and mainstream success

In 2004, Berryz Kobo was created with the intention of rotating all of the members of Hello! Project Kids to make time for school, but the idea was later scrapped, and the remaining girls who were not chosen were rebranded under the name Cute on June 11, 2005.

In addition to Cute's activities, Hagiwara briefly ventured into voice acting and played Hikaru Mizuki in the anime Kirarin Revolution from June to September 2007. As part of the show, she became part of the in-show subgroup Kira Pika with Morning Musume's Koharu Kusumi and released their only single, "Hana o Pūn / Futari wa NS" on August 1, 2007. Hagiwara also released her character's version of the song "Koi no Mahō wa Habibi no Bi" for the soundtrack. She made televised and concert appearances portraying Hikaru in real life and appeared as a special guest during Kirarin Revolution's final concert at Nakano Sun Plaza on May 4, 2009.

In 2009, Hagiwara, Saki Nakajima, and Erina Mano released the song "Kimi ga Iru Dake de" as Petit Moni V. In 2012, Hagiwara released her first solo DVD single "Ike! Genki-kun." In 2013, Hagiwara became part of the subgroup Hi-Fin for the Satoumi Movement. Hi-Fin released the song "Kaigan Seisō Danshi" on August 7, 2013 in a compilation album with other artists in the Satoumi Movement.

2016–2017: Disbandment of Cute
In August 2016, Cute announced plans to disband in June 2017, citing interest in different career paths as their reason. Hagiwara decided to retire from entertainment following the disbandment to study English abroad in New Zealand. In 2018, Hagiwara produced the apparel brand With Mii.

Personal life

On August 2, 2021, Hagiwara announced on her social media that she is married to a non-celebrity man.

Discography

Video singles

Soundtrack

Filmography

Film

Television

Theater

Solo DVDs

References

External links 
 Official Hello! Project profile 

1996 births
Living people
Cute (Japanese idol group) members
Hello! Project Kids members
Japanese women pop singers
Japanese idols
Petitmoni members
Musicians from Saitama Prefecture
21st-century Japanese singers
21st-century Japanese actresses
21st-century Japanese women singers